Vlatko Stojanovski (born 23 April 1997) is a Macedonian professional footballer who plays as a striker for Bulgarian First League club Septemvri Sofia and the North Macedonia national team.

Club career
A youth academy graduate of Metalurg Skopje, Stojanovski made his professional debut on 29 October 2014 in a 2–1 loss against Shkëndija. On 29 August 2015, he scored his first professional goal in a 2–1 loss against Mladost CD.

Stojanovski scored four goals in Renova's 9–1 league win against Pobeda on 4 May 2019. He finished 2018–19 season as the top scorer in Macedonian top division.

On 3 July 2019, French Ligue 1 club Nîmes Olympique announced the signing of Stojanovski on a three-year deal.

International career
He made his senior debut for North Macedonia in a November 2019 European Championship qualification match against Austria, in which he immediately scored his first international goal.

Career statistics

International

Scores and results list North Macedonia's goal tally first, score column indicates score after each Stojanovski goal.

References

External links
 

1997 births
Living people
People from Delčevo
Association football forwards
Macedonian footballers
North Macedonia under-21 international footballers
North Macedonia international footballers
Macedonian First Football League players
Second Football League (Croatia) players
First Football League (Croatia) players
Ligue 1 players
Championnat National 2 players
Ligue 2 players
FK Metalurg Skopje players
RNK Split players
NK Dugopolje players
FK Renova players
Nîmes Olympique players
FC Chambly Oise players
HNK Gorica players
KF Shkëndija players
UEFA Euro 2020 players
Macedonian expatriate footballers
Expatriate footballers in Croatia
Macedonian expatriate sportspeople in Croatia
Expatriate footballers in France
Macedonian expatriate sportspeople in France